John Sackett (June 3, 1944 – March 3, 2021) was an American politician who served in the Alaska House of Representatives from 1967 to 1971 and in the Alaska Senate from 1973 to 1987.

He died on March 3, 2021, at age 76.

References

1944 births
2021 deaths
Republican Party members of the Alaska House of Representatives
Republican Party Alaska state senators
People from Yukon–Koyukuk Census Area, Alaska